An anarkali salwar suit is a type of Salwar kameez originating from Punjab region of Mughal India. The anarkali suit is made up of a long, frock-style top and features a slim fitted bottom. It varies in length and embroidery such as floor-length. Anarkali is now wore by Bangladeshi, Indian and Pakistani women. Anarkalis are usually short and ends up to the knees.

Anarkali suits owe their name to the fictional Anarkali, a courtesan in the court of Mughal emperor Akbar.  According to the legend, she was murdered for her illicit relationship with the crown prince Salim, who later become the Emperor Jahangir.

The word anarkali translates to the "delicate bud of the pomegranate flower/tree." This name signifies the qualities of softness, vulnerability, innocence, and beauty associated with the women who wore anarkalis.

Types of Anarkali Suits
The following are some of the different types of Anarkali Suits.

Floor-Length
Pakistani
Cape Style
Jacket Style
Layered
Gown Style
Palazzo
Churidar

History
The Anarkali suit first became popular during the ancient Mughal era in India (Before partition) and Bengal and takes its name from Anarkali, a famous mistress of the Mughal Empire.  With the development, the mid-length, floor-length anarkali became popular.  Demand is finally increasing and it is one of the most popular Salwar kameez styles.  It is known for its long, flowing kurtas that beautifully complement every woman's look.  According to legend, Anarkali surprised everyone, especially Prince Selim, but her story ends tragically.  But her love is timeless and this is the beginning of the anakali suit style.  Women in the Mughal era wore this garment because it was made of luxurious fabric and had the power to add beauty.

See also
 Shalwar kameez

References 

South Asian culture
Indian clothing